David Barrallo Fuertes (born 4 June 1973 in Barcelona) is a paralympic athlete from Spain competing mainly in category T44 sprint events.

David competed as part of the Spanish Paralympic team at the 2000 Summer Paralympics in Sydney.  There he competed in the 200m and 400m and was part of both the Spanish  relay team and the silver medal-winning  relay team.

Notes

References

External links
 
 

1973 births
Living people
Spanish male sprinters
Paralympic athletes of Spain
Paralympic silver medalists for Spain
Paralympic medalists in athletics (track and field)
Athletes (track and field) at the 2000 Summer Paralympics
Medalists at the 2000 Summer Paralympics
Sprinters with limb difference
Paralympic sprinters